Krugman is an Americanized form of the German surname Krugmann,  an occupational surname based on occupation of a jug/mug seller/manufacturer or of an innkeeper. Notable people with the surname Krugman or Krugmann include:
 Irene Krugman Rudnick (1929–2019), American politician
 Martin Krugman (1919–1979), associate of the Lucchese crime family
 Morris Krugman (1899–1993), American psychologist
 Paul Krugman (born 1953), economist, New York Times columnist, and winner of the 2008 Nobel Memorial Prize in Economics
Robin Wells Krugman (born 1959), American economist
Roswitha Krugmann, marriage name of  Roswitha Eberl (born 1958), East German sprint canoer 
 Saul Krugman (1911–1995), inventor of the Hepatitis B vaccine.

See also

References